Stanley "Stan" G. Owen (7 March 1932 – 12 September 2019) was a Welsh rugby union, and professional rugby league footballer who played in the 1950s and 1960s.

Background
Stan Owen was born in Pontypridd, Wales, and he died aged 90 in Wigan Infirmary, His brother Samuel lived in Pontypridd and died in 1993. Wigan, Greater Manchester, England.

Playing career
Owen signed for Leigh in November 1951 and in a 13-year stay at the club made 415 appearances for the club, second only in number of appearances for Leigh to Albert Worrall. He played for Leigh in the  4–15 defeat by St. Helens in the 1963–64 Lancashire Cup Final at Knowsley Road on Saturday 26 October 1963.  In 1964 he transferred to St. Helens but after playing only 12 games for St. Helens he transferred to Rochdale Hornets for whom he made 95 appearances between 1964 and 1968 including Rochdale's 5–16 defeat by Warrington in the 1965–66 Lancashire Cup  Final at Knowsley Road, on Friday 29 October 1965.  His final move was to join Blackpool Borough in 1968 where he made 21 appearances before retiring from playing and became Borough's coach.

International honours
Stan Owen won a cap for Great Britain (RL) while at Leigh in 1958 against France, and represented Other Nationalities (RL) while at Rochdale Hornets, he played left-,  in the 2-19 defeat by St. Helens at Knowsley Road, St. Helens on Wednesday 27 January 1965, to mark the switching-on of new floodlights.

Stan Owen also represented English League XIII (RL) playing right- in the 19–8 victory over France at Headingley, Leeds on Wednesday 16 April 1958, and Wales (RL) while at Leigh in a non-Test match on Thursday 19 May 1955 against France 'B' at Stade Marcel Saupin, Nantes, and in a non-Test match on Sunday 17 February 1963 against France at Stadium Municipal, Toulouse.

References

External links
Profile at saints.org.uk

1932 births
2019 deaths
Blackpool Borough coaches
Blackpool Borough players
Footballers who switched code
Great Britain national rugby league team players
Leigh Leopards captains
Leigh Leopards players
Other Nationalities rugby league team players
Pontypridd RFC players
Rochdale Hornets players
Rugby league players from Pontypridd
Rugby league props
Rugby League XIII players
Rugby union players from Pontypridd
St Helens R.F.C. players
Wales national rugby league team players
Welsh rugby league players
Welsh rugby union players